James Cartwright (born 1949) is a United States Marine Corps general.

James Cartwright may also refer to:
 James H. Cartwright (1842–1924), American jurist
 James Cartwright (canoeist) (born 1976), Canadian canoer
 Jim Cartwright (born 1958), English dramatist

See also
 Jamie Hunter Cartwright